Brunn or Brünn is a common German place-name or place-name element which originally references a well, fountain, or source of a stream. It may refer to:

Places

 Bad Fischau-Brunn, Lower Austria
 Brünn, the German form of the Moravian city Brno
 Brunn, a village in the Swedish urban area of Hedesunda
 Brunn, German name for the village Bezrzecze, Police County, in north-western Poland
 Brunn am Gebirge, a town in Lower Austria, south of Vienna
 Brunn an der Wild, a town Lower Austria
 Brunn im Felde, part of the municipality Gedersdorf in Lower Austria
 Brunn, Mecklenburg-Vorpommern, a municipality in Mecklenburg-Vorpommern, Germany
 Brunn (Sachsen), a municipality in Germany
 Brunn, Sweden, in Värmdö Municipality, Stockholm County
 Brünn, Thuringia, a municipality in Thuringia, Germany
 Brunn, Nuremberg, an exclave of Nuremberg, Germany
 Brunn, Upper Palatinate, a town in Bavaria, Germany
 Johnsdorf-Brunn, a municipality in Styria, Austria
 Pölfing-Brunn, a municipality in Styria, Austria
 Sätra brunn, a locality situated in Västmanland County, Sweden
 Weißbrunn, German name for the Hungarian urban area Veszprém, north of Lake Balaton

Other
 Brunn (surname)
 Brunn & Company, American coachbuilder founded by Hermann A. Brunn (1874-1941) in Buffalo, New York

 See also Brunning